Nam Hae-il (born April 13, 1947) is a former South Korean naval officer who served as the 25th Chief of Naval Operations of the Republic of Korea Navy, appointed in 2005. He attended the Republic of Korea Naval Academy in 1972 and Naval War college in 1978.

References

1947 births
Living people
Chiefs of Naval Operations (South Korea)
Korea Naval Academy alumni